Nowa Brzeźnica  is a village (city rights since 1287 - 1870) in Pajęczno County, Łódź Voivodeship, in central Poland. It is the seat of the gmina (administrative district) called Gmina Nowa Brzeźnica. Birthplace of Jan Długosz, first polish historian.

The village has a population of ~750.

References

Villages in Pajęczno County
Sieradz Voivodeship (1339–1793)
Piotrków Governorate
Łódź Voivodeship (1919–1939)
Shtetls